Permian Investment Partners is a hedge fund founded in 2007 by then founder Cara Goldenberg, and joined by co-partners Alex Duran and Scott Hendrickson in 2008 prior to the firm's launch.  Its name is derived from the Permian geological period. Its offices are currently located at 295 Madison Avenue, New York NY.

The fund employs a long/short equity strategy with a focus on management change and management quality, predominantly in Western Europe.

The firm was the recipient of the 2012 Europe-Focused Global Emerging Manager award presented by S&P Capital IQ. In November 2011, Permian was among several large shareholders to publicly oppose Sun Pharmaceuticals' offer to acquire Taro Pharmaceuticals.

References

External links
Official website

Financial services companies established in 2008
Hedge fund firms in New York City